The Vlastimirović (Vlastimirovići / Властимировићи) was the first Serbian royal dynasty, named after Prince Vlastimir (ruled c. 831–851), who was recognized by the Byzantine Empire. The dynasty was established with the Unknown Archont, who ruled during the reign of Emperor Heraclius (610–641). The Vlastimirović dynasty ruled in Serbia until the 960s, when some of the Serbian lands were annexed by the Byzantine Empire.

History

One of the fundamental sources for the early Serbian history is the work of Byzantine Emperor Constantine VII Porphyrogenitos (913–959), De Administrando Imperio. In eight chapters, the settlement of Serbs and their early history is described up until the reign of the author. The 32nd chapter, with the sub-chapter On the Serbs and the lands that they currently inhabit, gives a short note on the origin of the Serbs, their homeland, and continues with the history of members of the oldest ruling family of the Serbs.

Early rulers

The progenitor, according to Porphyrogenitos, was the prince (unnamed in sources and this designated as the Unknown Archon) that led the Serbs to Southeastern Europe during the reign of Heraclius (610–641). The author gives the early genealogy: "As the Serb Prince who fled to Emperor Heraclius" in the time "when Bulgaria was under the Rhōmaíōn" (thus, before the establishment of Bulgaria in 680), "by succession, his son, and then grandson, and so on, of his family rules as princes. After some years, Višeslav is born, and from him Radoslav, and from him Prosigoj, and from him Vlastimir". The time and circumstances of the first three rulers are almost unknown. It is supposed that Višeslav ruled in  780, but it is unclear when Radoslav and Prosigoj would have ruled. When the Serbs were mentioned in 822 in the Royal Frankish Annals ("the Serbs, which is said to be holding the great part of Dalmatia"; ad Sorabos, quae natio magnam Dalmatiae partem obtinere dicitur) one of those two must have ruled Serbia. According to John (Jr.) Fine, it was hard to find Serbs in this area since the Byzantine sources were limited to the southern coast, also it is possible that among other tribes exists tribe of group of small tribes of Serbs.  Dalmatia, in the antique period, stretched from modern-day Dalmatia far into the hinterland, northwards close to the Sava river, and eastwards to the Ibar river. Višeslav's great-grandson Vlastimir began his rule in  830, and he is the oldest Serbian ruler on which there is substantial data.

Vlastimir, Mutimir and Pribislav

Vlastimir united the Serbian tribes in the vicinity. The Serbs were alarmed, and most likely consolidated due to the spreading of the Bulgarian Khanate towards their borders (a rapid conquest of neighbouring Slavs,) in self-defence, and possibly sought to cut off the Bulgar expansion to the south. Byzantine Emperor Theophilos (r. 829–842) was recognized as the nominal suzerain (overlord) of the Serbs, and most likely encouraged them to thwart the Bulgarians. The thirty-year-peace treaty between the Byzantines and Bulgarians, signed in 815, was still in effect.

According to Constantine VII, the Serbs and Bulgarians had lived peacefully as neighbours until the invasion in 839 (in the last years of Theophilos). It is not known what exactly prompted the war, as Porphyrogenitus gives no clear answer; whether it was a result of Serbian-Bulgarian relations, i.e., the Bulgar conquest to the southeast, or a result of the Byzantine-Bulgarian rivalry, in which Serbia was allied with the Byzantines. According to John B. Bury, it was not unlikely that the Emperor had a part in it; as he was at war with the Arabs, he may have pushed the Serbs to drive the Bulgarians from western Macedonia, which would benefit them both—hence, Malamir's action. V. Zlatarski supposed that the Emperor offered the Serbs complete independence in return. According to Porphyrogenitus, the Bulgarians wanted to continue their conquest of the Slav lands - to force the Serbs into subjugation. Presian I (r. 836–852) launched an invasion into Serbian territory in 839, which led to a war that lasted for three years, in which the Serbs were victorious; Presian was heavily defeated and lost a large number of his men, made no territorial gains and was driven out by the army of Vlastimir. It is believed that the Serbs held out in their defensible forests and gorges, and knew how to fight in the hills. According to Živković, it is possible that the Bulgarian attack came after the failed invasion of Struma and Nestos in 846 (see below): Presian may have collected his army and headed for Serbia, and Vlastimir may have participated in the Byzantine–Bulgarian Wars, which would mean that Presian was responding to a direct Serbian involvement.

After the victory over the Bulgarians, Vlastimir's status rose, and according to Fine, he went on to expand to the west, taking Bosnia and Herzegovina (Zahumlje). Vlastimir married off his daughter to Krajina, the son of a local župan of Trebinje, Beloje, in  847–48. With this marriage, Vlastimir elevated Krajina to archon. The Belojević family was granted the rule of Travunija. Krajina had a son with Vlastimir's daughter, named Hvalimir, who would later on succeed as župan of Travunia. Vlastimir's elevation of Krajina and the practical independence of Travunija show, according to Živković, that Vlastimir was a Christian ruler who very well understood the monarchical ideology that developed in the early Middle Ages.

Soon after 846, with the end of the thirty-year-truce, Malamir (or Presian) invaded the regions of the Struma and the Nestos, and Empress-Regent Theodora (r. 842–855, the wife of Theophilos) answered by attacking Thracian Bulgaria. A brief peace was concluded, then Malamir proceeded to invade Macedonia. The Bulgarians also imposed their rule on the Morava region, on the frontier between Serbia and the Bulgarian Khanate. The Byzantines were also active in the hinterland of Dalmatia, to the west of Serbia; the strategos of the cities of Dalmatia came into conflict with a Frankish vassal, the Croatian Duke Trpimir, in 846 or 848, in which the strategos was defeated.

The defeat of the Bulgarians, who had become one of the greater powers in the 9th century, shows that Serbia was an organized state, fully capable of defending its borders, and possessing a very high military and administrative organizational structure. It is not known whether Serbia at the time of Vlastimir had a system of fortifications or a developed military organization with clearly defined roles for the župan.

Prince Mutimir (ruled c. 851–891), the son of Vlastimir, managed to defeat the Bulgarians once again in 834–835, also capturing the son of the Bulgar Khan. The Serbs and Bulgarians made peace. The remaining years were marked by internal dynastic wars. In 892, prince Pribislav Mutimirović was overthrown by his cousin, prince Petar Gojniković.

By the middle of the 9th century, the process of Christianization of Serbia was finalized, and the Eparchy of Ras was established, in the time of Byzantine emperor Basil I.

Petar, Pavle, Zaharija and Časlav

Prince Petar Gojniković was recognized by the Bulgarians, now the greatest power in Southeastern Europe, although the peace was not to last; the Byzantines had sent an envoy to Serbia promising greater independence in return for Petar leading an army against the Bulgarians. A Bulgarian ally, Mihajlo Višević, who had seen a threat in Petar during the latter's conquest of Bosnia and Neretva, heard of the possible alliance and warned the Bulgarian Tzar, who later sent a protege, Pavle Branović, to rule Serbia. In the meantime, Zaharija Pribislavljević was sent by the Byzantines to take the Serbian throne, but he was captured by Pavle and sent to Bulgaria. Pavle was then approached by the Byzantines, and so Zaharija was persuaded by the Bulgarians to switch sides. Pavle planned an attack on Bulgaria, but Tzar Simeon was warned again, and dispatched Zaharija with an army, promising him the throne if he defeated Pavle, which he did. Zaharija soon resumed his Byzantine alliance, also uniting several Slavic tribes along the common border to revolt against the Bulgarians. Several Bulgarian generals were beheaded, their heads sent to Constantinople by Zaharija as a symbol of allegiance. In 924 a large Bulgarian army led by Časlav Klonimirović, the second cousin, ravaged Serbia, forcing Zaharija to flee. Instead of instating Časlav, however the Bulgarians annexed Serbia between 924 and 927.

Prince Časlav took the throne in 927, with the death of the Bulgar Tzar, and immediately concluded an alliance with the Byzantine Empire. Eastern Orthodox influence greatly increased and Časlav maintained close ties with the Byzantines throughout his reign. He enlarged Serbia, uniting the tribes of Bosnia, Herzegovina, Old Serbia and Montenegro (which included Pagania, Zahumlje, Travunia, Konavle, Bosnia and Rascia into Serbia, ι Σερβλια). He took over regions previously held by Michael Višević, who disappears from the historical record in 925. The De Administrando Imperio describes his realm: the shores of the Adriatic Sea, the Sava river and the Morava valley as well as today's northern Albania.

The written information about the first dynasty ends with the death of Časlav.

Aftermath
The Catepanate of Ras was established between 971 and 976, during the rule of John Tzimiskes (r. 969–976). A seal of a strategos of Ras has been dated to Tzimiskes' reign, making it possible that Tzimiskes' predecessor Nikephoros II Phokas was recognized in Rascia. The protospatharios and katepano of Ras was a Byzantine governor named John. Data on the katepano of Ras during Tzimiskes' reign is missing. Byzantine military presence ended soon thereafter with the wars with Bulgaria, and was re-established only ca. 1018 with the short-lived Theme of Sirmium, which, however, did not extend much into Serbia proper.

Five decades later, Jovan Vladimir emerged as the Prince of Serbs, ruling as a Bulgarian vassal from his seat at Bar. A possible descendant, Stefan Vojislav, led numerous revolts in the 1030s against the Byzantine Emperor (the overlord of the Serbian lands), successfully becoming independent by 1042. His realm included all lands earlier held by Časlav Klonimirović, and he would be eponymous with the second Serbian dynasty, the Vojislavljevići, who were based in Duklja. The latter may possibly have been a branch of the Vlastimirović dynasty.  A cadet branch of the Vojislavljević dynasty, the Vukanovići, emerged as the third dynasty in the 1090s. It was named after Grand Prince Vukan who held Rascia (the hinterland) under his cousin King of Duklja Constantine Bodin (ca. 1080–1090) in the beginning, but renounced any overlordship in 1091 when he raided many of the Byzantine towns of Kosovo and Macedonia. The Nemanjić dynasty, the most powerful in Serbian history, was founded by Stefan Nemanja, also a descendant of the same line.

Family tree

Unknown Archon (~610–641+), Leader of Serbs and their Byzantine Sclaviniae under Heraclius.
 Several generations
 Višeslav ( 780)
 Radoslav (~800–822)
 Prosigoj (822–836)
 Vlastimir (836–~850) (Founder), Defeated the Bulgarians in the Bulgar–Serb War (839–842).
 Mutimir (~850 – † 891–893), Defeated the Bulgarians in the Bulgar–Serb War (853).
 Pribislav Mutimirović, ruled (~891–893)
 Zaharija (921–924), brought to the throne by the Byzantines, removed by the Bulgarians
Bran Mutimirović, pretender to the throne 895–6
 Pavle (~917–921), brought to the throne by the Bulgarians, brought down by Byzantines
 Stefan Mutimirović
 Strojimir, vassal to Mutimir, later under Bulgarian khan Boris
 Klonimir,
 Časlav (927–960), liberated Serbian lands under Bulgarian occupation, unified Serbia
 Gojnik, vassal to brother Mutimir, later under khan Boris)
 Petar Gojniković (~892–918), captured by Bulgarians, died in captivity.
 Daughter, married Krajina Belojević

See also

List of Serbian monarchs
History of Serbia
History of the Serbs

Annotations

References

Sources
Primary

 
 
 
 
 
 
 

Secondary

External links
 Steven Runciman, A History of the First Bulgarian Empire, London 1930.
 

 
Principality of Serbia (early medieval)
Serbia in the Early Middle Ages
Serbian royal families
7th century in Serbia
8th century in Serbia
9th century in Serbia
10th century in Serbia